Green Lake Village Hall is located in Green Lake, Wisconsin, United States. It was added to both the State and the National Register of Historic Places in 2004.

History
The building was designed by W. C. Weeks Inc. and completed in 1939 with WPA help. Originally housed a gym and stage on the first floor and city offices, a library and fire departments in the basement. The gym's roof is supported by early laminated wooden arches.

References

City and town halls on the National Register of Historic Places in Wisconsin
Libraries on the National Register of Historic Places in Wisconsin
Fire stations on the National Register of Historic Places in Wisconsin
National Register of Historic Places in Green Lake County, Wisconsin
Works Progress Administration in Wisconsin
Gyms in the United States
Modern Movement architecture in the United States
Art Deco architecture in Wisconsin
Government buildings completed in 1939
1939 establishments in Wisconsin